Yiyang Town is a historic town and the former county seat of Changning City in Hunan, China. The town was established in 1935 and it was divided into 3 subdistricts and ceased to be as a separate town in 2008. It had 19 villages and 13 communities under its jurisdiction in 2007.

History
The town of Yiyang was established in 1935. From 1949 to 1952, it was a part of the first district in Changning County, and Chengguan Town (城关镇) was established in 1953. The town of Chengguan was reorganized as Hongqi People's Commune (红旗人民公社) in 1958 and Chengguan Town was restored in 1961. In May 1995, the town of Chengguan was renamed to Yiyang. Villages of Dali (大立), Wanshou (万寿) and Jinqiao (金桥) from the former Tonghuang Township (桐黄乡), villages of Huxi (虎溪), Tangshan (塘山), Lianhua (莲花) and Huangzhi (黄枝) from Zhengtong Township (正峒乡), villages of Xialian (夏联) and Chajian (茶箭) from Qutan Township (曲潭乡) and villages of Qingshi (青市) and Qushi (曲市) from Yaotang Township (瑶塘乡), the 11 villages were placed under the jurisdiction of Yiyang Town.

In 1998, the town had 20 villages under its jurisdiction. In 2000, it was divided into 19 villages and 13 communities, 186 villager's groups and 68 residential groups; there were 25,172 households with a population of 71,758. As of 2000 census, it had a population of 67,354. The town of Yiyang was divided into 3 subdistricts of Peiyuan, Quanfeng and Yiyang in 2008.

Subdivisions

References 

Changning, Hunan
Former township-level divisions of Hunan